In control theory, a causal system (also known as a physical or nonanticipative system) is a system where the output depends on past and

The idea that the output of a function at any time depends only on past and present values of input is defined by the property commonly referred to as causality.  A system that has some dependence on input values from the future (in addition to possible dependence on past or current input values) is termed a non-causal or acausal system, and a system that depends solely on future input values is an anticausal system.  Note that some authors have defined an anticausal system as one that depends solely on future and present input values or, more simply, as a system that does not depend on past input values. 

Classically, nature or physical reality has been considered to be a causal system.  Physics involving special relativity or general relativity require more careful definitions of causality, as described elaborately in Causality (physics).

The causality of systems also plays an important role in digital signal processing, where filters are constructed so that they are causal, sometimes by altering a non-causal formulation to remove the lack of causality so that it is realizable. For more information, see causal filter.

For a causal system, the impulse response of the system must use only the present and past values of the input to determine the output. This requirement is a necessary and sufficient condition for a system to be causal, regardless of linearity. Note that similar rules apply to either discrete or continuous cases. By this definition of requiring no future input values, systems must be causal to process signals in real time.

Mathematical definitions 

the corresponding outputs satisfy

Definition 2: Suppose  is the impulse response of any system  described by a linear constant coefficient differential equation. The system  is causal if and only if

otherwise it is non-causal.

Examples
The following examples are for systems with an input  and output .

Examples of causal systems 
 Memoryless system

 Autoregressive filter

Examples of non-causal (acausal) systems 

 Central moving average

Examples of anti-causal systems 

Look-ahead

References 

 

Classical control theory
Digital signal processing
Systems theory
Dynamical systems

de:Systemtheorie (Ingenieurwissenschaften)#Kausale Systeme